Penelope Umbrico (born January 31, 1957) is an American artist best known for her work that appropriates images found using search engines and picture sharing websites.

Education and career 

Umbrico was born in Philadelphia in 1957. She graduated from the Ontario College of Art in Toronto, Canada in 1980. She obtained her M.F.A. in 1989 at the School of Visual Arts in New York.

Exhibitions 
In 2010 her exhibition, As Is, at LMAK Projects featured a series of work called Broken Sets (EBay) (2009–2010), which consisted of images of broken LCD television screens that were acquired from pictures posted by eBay sellers trying to sell damaged television sets for parts.

Her project Suns from Flickr started in 2006 when she found 541,795 pictures of sunsets searching the word "sunset" on the photo-sharing web site Flickr while looking for the most photographed subject (which the sunset turned out to be). She took just the suns from these pictures and made Kodak snapshot prints of them.

For each installation, the title reflects the number of hits she gets searching "sunset" on Flickr at the time – for example, the first installation was "541,795 Suns From Flickr" in 2006; subsequent installations were: "2303057 Suns From Flickr (Partial) 9/25/07" (2007); "3,221,717 Suns From Flickr (Partial) 3/31/08" (2008); "5,911,253 Suns From Flickr (Partial) 8/03/09" (2009) – the title itself becoming a comment on the ever-increasing use of web-based photo communities and a reflection of the collective content there.

Her work has been published in the New York Times Magazine, on the cover and inside spreads accompanying "Ghosts in the Machine". In March 2012, Art in America featured Umbrico's work on the cover and inside along with a short essay by the artist.

She has served as a member of faculty at Bard College's Summer MFA (Milton Avery Graduate School of the Arts) (Chair of MFA Photography from 2004 to 2010), and she is a core faculty member at the School of Visual Arts MFA Photography Video and Related Media in NYC.

Publications
 Variants, 1991
 From Catalogs, 1998
 Out of Place, 2002
 Honeymoon Suites, 2002
 Many Leonards Not Natman, 2010
 Desk Trajectories (As Is), 2010
 Signals Still / Ink (Book) / Out of Order, from the series Signal to Ink, 2011
 Penelope Umbrico: Photographs, Apeture, 2011
 Moving Mountains (1850–2012), Conveyor, 2012
 RANGE, Aperture, 2014
 Out of Order: Used Office Desks and Used Office Plants for Sale, RVB, 2014
 Out of Order: Bad Display, RVB and Photoforum Pasquart, 2016
 Solar Eclipses From the New York Public Library Picture Collection, RVB, 2016

Awards, grants and residencies
 Sharpe-Walentas Studio Fellowship
 Pilchuck Glass School, Artist in Residence
 John Gutmann Photography Fellowship
 Smithsonian Artist Research Fellowship
 Guggenheim Fellowship
 Peter S. Reed Foundation Grant
 New York Foundation for the Arts Artists Fellowship
 Anonymous Was A Woman Award
 Aaron Siskind Foundation Individual Photographer's Fellowship Grant
 New York Foundation for the Arts Catalogue Project Grant

Exhibitions

Solo exhibitions
 Festival Images Vevey Biennale, Range: of Mount Grammont, site-specific installation, Vevey, Switzerland, 2020
George Eastman Museum, Everyone’s Moon Any License, Rochester NY, 2019
Ballarat International Foto Biennale, Everyone’s Moon Any License, Ballarat, Australia, 2019
Musée des Beaux Arts, Le Locle, Switzerland, 2018
Peoria Riverfront Museum, Screen Light, Peoria, IL, 2017
Special Project, Photo LA, Los Angeles, CA, 2017
Salon d'Honeur, Paris Photo, Range: of Masters, Paris France, 2016
Milwaukee Art Museum, Future Perfect, mid-career survey, WI, 2016
Photoforum PasquArt, Biel/Bienne Festival of Photography, Bienne, Switzerland, 2016
Bruce Silverstein Gallery, Silvery Light, NYC, 2016
Grand Central Terminal Light Boxes, Four Photographs of Rays at Grand Central, NY, 2015–2016
Aldrich Museum, Shallow Sun, CT, 2015
Alt. + 1000 Festival de Photographie, A Proposal and Two Trades, Rossinière, Switzerland, 2013
Percent For Art/New York Department of Cultural Affairs, Cabinet 1526–2013, permanent installation for PS/IS 71, completed 2013
Olson Gallery, Bethel University, St Paul, MN, 2013
Alt. + 1000 Festival de Photographie, Mountains, Moving: Of Swiss Alp Postcards and Sound of Music, Rossinière, Switzerland, 2013
Paraty Em Foco, Future, Paraty, Brazil, 2011
Toronto Pearson International Airport, Universal Sunset, site-specific installation, Contact Photography Festival, 2010
Brooklyn Academy of Music, Leonards for Leonard, site-specific installation, Brooklyn, NY, 2010
Bernard Toale Gallery, Boston, MA, 2004
International Center of Photography, New York, 1992

Group exhibitions
 George Eastman Museum, Gathering Clouds, Rochester, NY, 2020
Metro Arts, New For Old, Brisbane, Australia, 2020
University of Michigan Museum of Art, Art in the Age of the Internet, 1989 to Today, Ann Arbor, MI, 2019
Onassis Cultural Centre, For Ever More Images, Athens, Greece, 2019
Metropolitan Museum of Art, Apollo's Muse, New York, 2019
Postmasters Gallery, Screenscapes, New York, 2018
Chrysler Museum of Art, From Ansel Adams to Infinity, Norfolk, VA, 2018
Victoria and Albert Museum, inaugural media wall commission, London, 2018
Institute of Contemporary Art, Art in the Age of the Internet, 1989 to Today, Boston, MA, 2018
Denver Art Museum, New Territory: Landscape Photography Today, Denver, CO, 2018
Jimei x Arles International Photo Festival, Visuality is the Scene of Negligence, Jimei Civic Center and Three Shadows, China, 2017
Guangzhou Image Triennial 2017 – Simultaneous Eidos, (installation), Guangzhou, China, 2017
DeCordova Museum, Screens: Virtual Material, Lincoln, MA, 2017
Galerie Andreas Schmidt, Perfect / Imperfect, Berlin, Germany, 2017
Goethe Institut, Cyclic Journey/s, Barcelona, Spain, 2017
Photo Espana, Upload/Download, Madrid, Spain, 2017
Jeonju International Photo Festival, This Location / Dis-location, Jeonju, China, 2017
LACMA, TV on Film, Los Angeles, CA, 2017
Carnegie Museum of Art, Strength in Numbers: Photography in Groups, Pittsburgh, PA, 2016
Harry Ransom Center, Look Inside: New Photography Acquisitions, Austin, TX, 2016
Museum für Kunst und Gewerbe, Triennial of Photography, Hamburg, Germany, 2015
Gallery University Stellenbosch, Think of Number 6, Stellenbosch, South Africa, 2015
Ivorypress Space, Books beyond Artists: Words and Images, Madrid, Spain, 2015
Motorenhalle, DIGITAL_ANALOG.INDIFFERENCE, Dresden, Germany, 2015
Boulder Museum of Contemporary Art, Flatlander, Boulder, CO, 2015
Sextant et plus, FOMO, Marseille, France, 2015
BRIC Arts Media House, Brooklyn Biennial, Brooklyn, NY, 2014
Museum of Modern Art, A World of Its Own: Photographic Practices in the Studio, New York, 2014
Orange County Museum of Art, California Landscape into Abstraction, Newport Beach, CA, 2014
Kasseler Kunstverein, Offline Art: Hardcore, curated by Aram Bartholl, Kassel, Germany, 2013
Le Mois de Photo, Montreal, Canada, 2013
Centre d'Art Santa Mònica, From Here On, Barcelona, Spain, 2013
Foto Colectania, Artist as Collector, Barcelona, Spain, 2013
Somerset House, Landmark: The Fields of Photography, London, 2013
Aperture Foundation Gallery, Aperture Remix, New York, 2012
319 Scholes Gallery, Collect the WWWorld, Bushwick, NY, 2012
Daegu Photography Biennale, Repositioned Personal, Korea, 2012
Photographers' Gallery, Born in 1987: The Animated GIF, London, 2012
Pace MacGill Gallery, Social Media, New York, 2011
Rencontres d'Arles, From Here On, curated by Fontcuberta, Parr, Schmid, Kessels, Cheroux, Arles, France, 2011
MassMoCA, Memery: Imitation, Memory, and Internet Culture, North Adams, MA, 2011
San Francisco Museum of Modern Art, The Anniversary Show, San Francisco, CA, 2009
PS 1 Contemporary Art Center, Between Spaces, Long Island City, NY, 2009
Aperture Foundation Gallery, The Edge of Vision, New York, 2009
New York Photography Festival, The Ubiquitous Image, May 2008
Gallery of Modern Art, The Leisure Class, Brisbane, Australia, October 2007 – March 2008
Center for Curatorial Studies, Bard College, Neither Here Nor There: Perceptions of Place, Feb. 2005
Massachusetts College of Art, Feed, Boston, MA, October 2004
The Museum of Modern Art, Object and Abstraction: Contemporary Photographs, NY, Sept. 1997
International Center of Photography, Eye of the Beholder, New York, September 1997
Creative Time, Art in the Anchorage '96, The Brooklyn Bridge Anchorage, Summer 1996
The Museum of Modern Art, More Than One Photography, New York, May 1992
Art in General, The Results Are In, New York, January 1992
The Drawing Center, Selections 41, New York, February 1988

Unclassified exhibitions
 2009: For A Brief Time Only at a Location Near You
 2011: Exhibition at Rencontres d'Arles festival, Arles, France.
 2011: Laureate from Rencontres d'Arles Discovery Award.

Collections
Umbrico's work is held in the following public collections:
 Berkeley Art Museum, CA
 International Center of Photography
 Metropolitan Museum of Art
 Museum of Contemporary Photography
 San Francisco Museum of Modern Art
Carnegie Museum of Art, PA
George Eastman Museum, Rochester, NY
Harry Ransom Center, Austin, TX
Los Angeles County Museum of Art, CA
McNay Museum, San Antonio, TX
Milwaukee Art Museum, Milwaukee, WI
Minneapolis Institute of Art, Minneapolis, MN
Museum für Kunst und Gewerbe, Hamburg, Germany
Museum of Contemporary Art San Diego, CA
Museum of Fine Arts, Houston, TX
Museum of Modern Art, New York, NY
Perez Art Museum Miami, FL
Portland Art Museum, OR
RISD Museum, RI
Thoma Art Foundation, Chicago IL
Victoria and Albert Museum, London
New York Public Library, NY
Orange County Museum of Art, CA
Guggenheim Museum, New York

References 

1980 births
American women photographers
Artists from Philadelphia
School of Visual Arts faculty
Living people
OCAD University alumni
School of Visual Arts alumni
American women academics
21st-century American women